What Time Is It There? is a 2001 Taiwanese film directed by Tsai Ming-liang. It stars Lee Kang-sheng, Chen Shiang-chyi, and Lu Yi-ching.

Plot
Hsiao-kang is a street vendor in Taipei who sells watches out of a briefcase. His father dies. Soon afterwards, Shiang-chyi goes to him to buy a dual-time watch, as she is taking a trip to Paris. She likes Hsiao-kang's personal watch, which is out of stock. At first, he refuses to sell his watch, explaining that his father just died and that it would be bad luck. She is persistent and eventually convinces him to sell the watch to her. Hsiao-kang's mother mourns her husband's death; she leaves out food and water for him and thinks that he could be reincarnated. Hsiao-kang watches a film set in Paris, The 400 Blows. During his daily routines, he changes every watch and clock to Paris time. Meanwhile, in Paris, Shiang-chyi is alone as she stays in her room and goes to shops, restaurants, and the subway. Hsiao-kang's mother sees that the clock in her house has changed time and thinks that it is because her husband is back. She turns off the lights in the house and blocks all the windows, and she and Hsiao-kang argue.

Shiang-chyi visits a cemetery and has a chance encounter with Jean-Pierre Léaud, the lead actor of The 400 Blows. At a restaurant, she meets another Chinese woman, and they go back to the Chinese woman's place. They sleep in the same bed and kiss before the Chinese woman turns away. Hsiao-kang's mother eats dinner with a plate set for her husband, and afterwards she masturbates in bed. Hsiao-kang spends the night out and then has sex with a prostitute in his car. While he is sleeping, the prostitute steals his briefcase of watches and leaves. Hsiao-kang goes home and lays down next to his mother. Shiang-chyi cries while sitting on a bench by a pool. She falls asleep, and some people take her suitcase and put it in the pool. Hsiao-kang's father appears. He takes the suitcase out of the water and walks away.

Cast
Lee Kang-sheng as Hsiao-kang
Chen Shiang-chyi as Shiang-chyi
Lu Yi-ching as Hsiao-kang's mother
Miao Tien as Hsiao-kang's father
Cecilia Yip as Chinese woman in Paris
Chen Chao-jung as Chinese man in subway
Tsai Guei as Prostitute
Jean-Pierre Léaud as Jean-Pierre / Man at cemetery
 as Man at telephone booth
David Ganansia as Man at restaurant
Tsai Chao-yi as Clock store owner

Reception
On review aggregator website Rotten Tomatoes, the film has an approval rating of 85% based on 54 reviews and an average rating of 7.1/10. The website's critical consensus reads, "Though it requires patience to view, What Time Is It There?s exploration of loneliness is both elegant and haunting." On Metacritic, the film has a weighted average score of 79 out of 100 based on 20 critics, indicating "generally favorable reviews."

Awards
Cannes Film Festival: Technical Grand Prize (Tu Duu-Chih for sound design)
Chicago International Film Festival: Grand Jury Prize, Best Director, Best Cinematography
Golden Horse Awards: Special Jury Award

References

External links

2001 films
2001 drama films
Taiwanese drama films
2000s Mandarin-language films
Films directed by Tsai Ming-liang
Films with screenplays by Tsai Ming-liang